Jonku is a medium-sized lake in the Iijoki main catchment area. It is located in Pudasjärvi municipality, in the region of Northern Ostrobothnia in Finland. Jonku is also a village in the Pudasjärvi municipality.

See also
List of lakes in Finland

References

Lakes of Pudasjärvi